Nikolay Vsevolodovich Cheburkin (in Russian: Николай Всеволодович Чебуркин) (May 3, 1941, Orsk, Orenburg Oblast – December 20, 2021, Moscow) was a Russian scientist and inventor in the field of laser physics. He was the head of various research institutes and companies depending on the Ministry of Defence of the Russian Federation. 

N. V. Cheburkin was a Doctor of Sciences (Doctor nauk) in physical and mathematical sciences, as well as a professor. Throughout his career, his work was awarded numerous state prizes: the USSR State Prize, the Prize of the Council of Ministers of the Soviet Union, the State Prize of the Russian Federation. He was also an Honored Scientist of the Russian Federation, an Honoured Inventor of the RSFSR and a member of the Russian Academy of Engineering.

N. V. Cheburkin is the author of numerous scientific patents, articles and publications.

Biography 
Born on May 3, 1941, in the city of Orsk (Orenburg Oblast) into a family of doctors and teachers, N. V. Cheburkin then moved to Moscow to complete graduate studies in physics. In 1964 he graduated from the Moscow Power Engineering Institute with a degree in Applied Physical Optics. From 1964 to 1966, he began working at KB IVIS (Zelenograd, Moscow), and from 1967 to 1970 at Vympel NPO (Moscow). During this period, he is a PhD student at Lomonosov Moscow State University (1966–1969), and an engineer at Lomonosov University until 1970.

In 1970, he started working at NPO Astrofizika, first as a team supervisor, before attaining the position of vice director of Research, and later becoming the director and chief engineer-constructor of OKB Granat.

In 1993, he became director-general («Генеральный директор») and general engineer-constructor («Генеральный конструктор») of the Federal State Unitary Enterprise of high-energy lasers V. K. Orlov OKB Granat. In parallel, he was the Head of the department of high-power lasers at MIREA - Russian Technological University.

N. V. Cheburkin has trained several dozens of high-level specialists in the fields of laser physics and laser technologies.

Collaborators, colleagues: N. D. Ustinov, V. K. Orlov, P. V. Zarubin, I. N. Matveev.

Businesses and positions 

 OKB Granat for high-energy lasers: general director, general engineer-constructor
 State Scientific Center for Laser Systems of the Russian Federation Astrofizika: chief engineer-constructor, head of the Center for Joint Projects

Academic degrees and titles 

 1987: Doctor of Physical and Mathematical Sciences (Doctor nauk)
 1990: Professor

Awards, Prizes 

 1978: Laureate of the USSR State Prize
 1990: Laureate of the Prize of the Council of Ministers of the USSR
 1990: Medal "Veteran of Labor"
 1997: Medal "In Commemoration of the 850th Anniversary of Moscow"
 2000: Laureate of the State Prize of the Russian Federation

Sources and links 

1941 births
2021 deaths
People from Orsk
Soviet physicists
Soviet inventors
Laser researchers
Russian inventors
Moscow State University alumni
Recipients of the USSR State Prize
Honorary titles of the Soviet Union
State Prize of the Russian Federation laureates
Honorary titles of Russia
Honoured Scientists of the Russian Federation
20th-century Russian scientists
21st-century Russian scientists
Burials in Troyekurovskoye Cemetery